Sussi may refer to:

Sussi (cloth), a type of cloth from South Asia
Andrea Sussi (born 1973), Italian football player and coach
Christian Sussi (born 2001), Italian football player
Sussi, a female given name, diminutive of Susanne
 Sussi (film), a film directed by Gonzalo Justiniano

See also 
 Susi (disambiguation)
 Sussie (disambiguation)
 Sussy (disambiguation)